The First State Bank of St. Joseph, Minnesota, United States, is a historic bank building constructed in 1918.  Its elaborate terracotta façade suggests Egyptian Revival architecture, a rarely used style in Minnesota.  The building was listed on the National Register of Historic Places in 1982 for its local significance in the theme of architecture.  It was nominated for the aesthetic value its sophisticated and atypical design lends to St. Joseph's principal commercial street.

See also
 National Register of Historic Places listings in Stearns County, Minnesota

References

External links

1918 establishments in Minnesota
Bank buildings on the National Register of Historic Places in Minnesota
Buildings and structures in Stearns County, Minnesota
Commercial buildings completed in 1918
Egyptian Revival architecture in the United States
National Register of Historic Places in Stearns County, Minnesota